Frank Bryan Ntilikina (born 28 July 1998) is a French professional basketball player for the Dallas Mavericks of the National Basketball Association (NBA). He was selected by the New York Knicks as the eighth overall pick during the 2017 NBA draft. Ntilikina was born in Belgium and grew up in the French city of Strasbourg.

Early life
Ntilikina was born in Ixelles, Belgium, on 28 July 1998, to Rwandan parents, he moved to Strasbourg, France at age three. He began his youth club career at the age of five, playing for St-Joseph Strasbourg, before making the move to Strasbourg IG's youth academy when he was 15.

Ntilikina was invited to participate in the Jordan Brand Classic International Game in April 2014, tallying six points, three rebounds and one assist in 23 minutes off the bench, and helped SIG to a French Youth League Championship title in the 2014–15 season.

In February 2016, he attended the "Basketball Without Borders Global Camp" in Toronto, Canada, during the 2016 NBA All-Star Weekend.

Professional career

SIG Strasbourg (2015–2017)
In December 2015, Ntilikina signed a professional contract with SIG Strasbourg until 30 June 2019. He had made his debut at the professional level even before the deal, seeing 15 minutes of action on 4 April 2015, in a French LNB Pro A 2014–15 season contest against Boulogne-sur-Mer.

On 15 October 2015, Ntilikina logged his first EuroLeague minutes, scoring one point in 12 minutes and 16 seconds of play against KK Crvena zvezda.

He saw the court in 32 contests during the 2015–16 Pro A season, scoring 1.2 points per game, and he was named the league's Best Young Player. In the 2016–17 season, Ntilikina became a key part of the Strasbourg team, as he appeared in 45 games for the team while averaging 19.3 minutes per game. His successful campaign led him to winning his second straight Pro A Best Young Player award.

2017 NBA draft
In April 2017, Ntilikina entered his name into the 2017 NBA draft. By NBA draft's entry deadline on 12 June, he became one of only 10 international underclassmen to remain in the NBA draft that year. Ntilikina also became one of 20 invitees for the green room on draft night. The night before the draft, Ntilikina played Game 4 in the LNB Pro A Finals with SIG Strasbourg before traveling to Brooklyn, New York to participate in the draft personally. After that night, he played his last game with SIG Strasbourg with them losing the LNB Pro A Finals to Élan Chalon.

During the build-up to the draft, there was heavy speculation that the Dallas Mavericks would select Ntilikina with the ninth overall pick. The Mavericks' owner Mark Cuban was quoted as saying that the Mavericks wanted a "pass-first point guard" and said "We can maybe go a little bit more for a project", both of which Ntilikina fit the bill for. When the Knicks ended taking Ntilikina with the eighth pick, the Mavericks chose point guard Dennis Smith Jr.

Ntilikina was also rumoured to be coveted by the Knicks' front office and coaching staff, with whom he met in person.

New York Knicks (2017–2021)
On 22 June 2017, Ntilikina was selected by the New York Knicks with the eighth pick in the 2017 NBA draft. On 5 July, Ntilikina signed with the Knicks. He was the second youngest active player in the NBA during his rookie year behind Ike Anigbogu. Ntilikina made his NBA debut on 19 October 2017, in a 105–84 loss to the Oklahoma City Thunder. He scored his first points on 28 October against the Brooklyn Nets in a 107–86 win. He recorded nine points, two rebounds, five assists and a steal during the Knicks' home opener. On 15 January 2018, Ntilikina recorded his first double-double with 10 points, 10 assists, seven rebounds, two blocks, and a steal in a 119–104 win over the Brooklyn Nets. On 24 January 2018, he was selected to represent Team World for the Rising Stars Challenge during the 2018 NBA All-Star Weekend. His rookie season in New York was considered by many as underwhelming, and was often claimed to be a draft bust.

Ntilkina was limited to 43 games in his second season due to injuries.

Heading into his third season, Ntilikina was coming off a strong performance in the 2019 FIBA Basketball World Cup. In the early part of the season, Ntilikina took over starting point guard duties and began to show great signs of defense. On 23 November 2019, Ntilikina racked up six steals in a 111–104 loss to San Antonio Spurs. However, like his previous two seasons, he struggled to shoot the ball and eventually was demoted in favor of Elfrid Payton.

Dallas Mavericks (2021–present)
On 16 September 2021, Ntilikina signed with the Dallas Mavericks. He made his debut on 21 October 2021, in a 87–113 loss to the Atlanta Hawks, playing four minutes.

National team career
Ntilikina averaged 7.4 points, 2.0 assists, 1.6 rebounds, and one steal per game, en route to winning the 2014 FIBA Europe Under-16 Championship with the Under-16 French Junior National Team.

He was spectacular in helping France's Under-18 national team win the 2016 FIBA Europe Under-18 Championship, scoring 31 points, including 7-for-10 from three-point range, in the championship game against the Under-18 Lithuanian team. He averaged 15.2 points, 4.5 assists, 2.8 rebounds, and 2.2 steals a game in the tournament, draining 50 percent of his field goal attempts, including 58.6 percent of his shots from long distance, en route to Most Valuable Player honors.

Ntilikina dished out a game-high eight assists, to go along with 13 points and four rebounds, at the FIBA European Under-18 All-Star Game, in September 2015.

Ntilikina helped France win a bronze medal in the 2019 FIBA Basketball World Cup.

NBA career statistics

Regular season

|-
| style="text-align:left;"|
| style="text-align:left;"|New York
| 78 || 9 || 21.9 || .364 || .318 || .721 || 2.3 || 3.2 || .8 || .2 || 5.9
|-
| style="text-align:left;"|
| style="text-align:left;"|New York
| 43 || 16 || 21.0 || .337 || .287 || .767 || 2.0 || 2.8 || .7 || .3 || 5.7
|-
| style="text-align:left;"|
| style="text-align:left;"|New York
| 57 || 26 || 20.8 || .393 || .321 || .864 || 2.1 || 3.0 || .9 || .3 || 6.3
|-
| style="text-align:left;"|
| style="text-align:left;"|New York
| 33 || 4 || 9.8 || .367 || .479 || .444 || .9 || .6 || .5 || .1 || 2.7
|-
| style="text-align:left;"|
| style="text-align:left;"|Dallas
| 58 || 5 || 11.8 || .399 || .342 || .960 || 1.4 || 1.2 || .5 || .1 || 4.1
|- class="sortbottom"
| style="text-align:center;" colspan="2"|Career 
| 269 || 60 || 17.9 || .371 || .331 || .775 || 1.8 || 2.3 || .7 || .2 || 5.2

Playoffs

|-
| style="text-align:left;"|
| style="text-align:left;"|New York
| 3 || 0 || 1.3 || .000 || .000 ||  || .0 || .0 || .0 || .0 || .0
|-
| style="text-align:left;"|
| style="text-align:left;"|Dallas
| 12 || 0 || 10.3 || .333 || .300 || 1.000 || 1.0 || .8 || .7 || .1 || 1.9
|- class="sortbottom"
| style="text-align:center;" colspan="2"|Career 
| 15 || 0 || 8.5 || .320 || .286 || 1.000 || .8 || .6 || .5 || .1 || 1.5

References

External links

 
Frank Ntilikina at euroleague.net

Frank Ntilikina at lnb.fr 

1998 births
Living people
2019 FIBA Basketball World Cup players
Basketball players at the 2020 Summer Olympics
Black French sportspeople
Dallas Mavericks players
French expatriate basketball people in the United States
French men's basketball players
French people of Rwandan descent
Medalists at the 2020 Summer Olympics
National Basketball Association players from France
New York Knicks draft picks
New York Knicks players
Olympic basketball players of France
Olympic medalists in basketball
Olympic silver medalists for France
People from Ixelles
Point guards
SIG Basket players
Sportspeople from Strasbourg
Black Belgian sportspeople
Sportspeople from Brussels